John Callahan's Quads! (or simply Quads!) is an adult cartoon produced by Nelvana. It was created by and based upon the work of John Callahan, who also created another Nelvana-produced cartoon, Pelswick. The show aired on Teletoon at Night in Canada, SBS in Australia, and in Latin America on Locomotion and Adult Swim. The show never aired in the United States; however, the series was released on YouTube in 2018. This was the first show animated completely using the Macromedia Flash software, then came Max & Ruby, another Canadian show made by Nelvana, and finally, ¡Mucha Lucha! became the first of its kind for American television.

It was produced by Animation Works, Nelvana Limited, Media World Features, SBS Independent, and Film Victoria, with support from ScreenWest and the Lotteries Commission of Western Australia. It was first aired on Teletoon at Night on February 2, 2001.

Characters
Reilly O'Reilly – The show's main protagonist and antihero, he is paralyzed from the neck down and confined to a wheelchair after getting run over by his future neighbor, Mort Bromberg. The lawsuit against Mort yields him a luxury home in Forest Hills, which he invites his friends to live with him in. For the most part, he is an apathetic and cynical slacker whose main (and only) incentives in life include fornicating with his girlfriend Franny, drinking, and hatching new get-rich-quick schemes (usually with the assistance of other morally dubious individuals such as Blazer and Griz) that typically end in disaster.
Franny – Reilly's soulmate, spiritual advisor, lover, and best friend. She is a young and hairy woman who is known for her voluptuous figure, with wavy red hair in a ponytail and a pale complexion. She appears to be a sexualized love-interest and a stereotypical hippie who is into environmental activism, sexuality, New Age spiritualism, and abstains from shaving her bodily hair (except on special occasions as a special gift to Reilly). She also acts as the moral center of an otherwise amoral and disordered household, as well as a running gag where Franny is a frequent object of lust to perverted men like Blazer who repeatedly attempts (and fails) to hit on her.
Spalding – One of the more stable members of the group, he is Reilly's personal caregiver. He is a homosexual with a well-built physique and is originally from Australia. Although good-intentioned, he is a drama queen who craves attention and allows his overt sexuality to get the best of him at times.
Blazer – Having lost his entire body as a result of gambling debts, he has been reduced to a head on a skateboard, which he uses as a means of mobility. He is a crude, ill-mannered, and cantankerous pervert who will go to any length to proposition women for even the most obscene sexual favors (such as asking Deborah if he can watch her go to the bathroom). Blazer is also the most nihilistic and amoral of the group, thus making him extremely manipulative and deceptive. As such, he is not above habitually lying to and exploiting his friends (or anyone, for that matter) for his own personal gain (financial, sexual, or otherwise).
Lefty – Formerly a professional masseur, he lost his hands after having mistaken a wild dog's behind for his client's back and were bitten off (an event he still has nightmares about, as shown in one episode). He is an educated and cultured individual that typically finds himself at odds with his housemates, who contrast him personality-wise.
Fontaine – A blind Black man with a gentle and caring demeanor. Due to his blindness and trusting nature, he is frequently taken advantage of by the others (especially Reilly and Blazer) in their many escapades. In one episode, it is revealed he has an illegitimate son who is also blind.  
Griz – The apotheosis of unrefined, Griz is a large, disheveled oaf of a man who speaks with an Irish accent and rivals Blazer in his crassness. According to him in one episode, he changes his shirt only once every leap year. He runs a seedy, dilapidated dive bar, infested with rats and cockroaches, that the group frequent for their drinking needs. Griz is perpetually drunk and, as a result, prone to fits of alcoholic rage and extremely poor judgment, the latter of which includes driving severely intoxicated and encouraging the dishonest deeds of others. On the rare occasion Griz is seen sober, he is quick to "fix" this by immediately consuming large quantities of alcohol to return to what he perceives to be his natural state, as he looks upon sobriety with contempt. He also has a sister who is equally repugnant in the way she carries herself.
Mort Bromberg – The man responsible for running Reilly over with his car, crippling him. Feeling guilty, Mort unwittingly buys Reilly an extravagant mansion next to his own, much to the chagrin of his wife, Liz, who despises Reilly and his friends. Despite caring for his wife and doing anything he can to please her, he is often met with Liz's callous indifference to his efforts and even well-being (such as Liz opting to go shopping for a black dress instead of calling for help when Mort suffered a heart attack, in one episode).
Liz Bromberg – Mort's cold-blooded wife. Liz detests Reilly and his friends simply because they are disabled and feels their disadvantaged nature does not gel with the environment of their affluent neighbourhood. She initially tried to have the group evicted, but subsequent episodes revolved around her finding some way to take advantage of them.
Deborah – The group's physical therapist who runs a rehabilitation clinic the group frequent for sessions with. She is cheerful and positive, yet addresses the group in a patronizing manner, especially Fontaine, who she speaks to in Ebonics, perhaps assuming he cannot understand standard English.
Sister Butch – A Catholic nun who resides in the cathedral next door to Reilly's house and frequently spies on him and his activities using a pair of binoculars. A harsh and vindictive disciplinarian who believes she is doing God's work, she is often seen attempting to proselytize and force her views down the throats of others. Like Liz Bromberg, Sister Butch is contemptuous of Reilly and his friends, yet, however, does come to his aid on several occasions and even saves his life twice. This is most likely an ulterior motive to persuade Reilly into attending church more regularly.

Voice cast 
James Kee as Reilly O'Reilly
Terri Hawkes as Franny
Matthew King as Spalding
Cliff Saunders as Blazer
Paul Haddad as Lefty
Hamish Hughes as Griz
Diane Fabian as Liz Bromberg
Marvin Kaye as Mort Bromberg
Maurice Dean Wint as Fontaine
Linda Kash as Deborah
Corinne Conley as Sister Butch

Episodes

Season 1 (2001)

Season 2 (2002)

References

External links 
Animation Works site

Rotten Tomatoes page

2000s Canadian adult animated television series
2000s Canadian animated comedy television series
2001 Canadian television series debuts
2002 Canadian television series endings
2000s Australian animated television series
2001 Australian television series debuts
2002 Australian television series endings
Australian adult animated comedy television series
Australian flash animated television series
Canadian adult animated comedy television series
Funimation
Canadian flash animated television series
English-language television shows
Special Broadcasting Service original programming
Teletoon original programming
Television series by Nelvana
Television series created by John Callahan
Television shows about disability
Television shows based on comics